The Bambusinae are a subtribe of bamboo (tribe Bambuseae of the family Poaceae). It comprises 17 genera.

Genera

Bambusa
Bonia
Cochinchinochloa
Dendrocalamus
Fimbribambusa
Gigantochloa
Laobambos
Maclurochloa
Melocalamus
Neomicrocalamus
Oreobambos
Oxytenanthera
Phuphanochloa
Pseudobambusa T.Q.Nguyen
Pseudoxytenanthera
Soejatmia
Thyrsostachys
Vietnamosasa
Yersinochloa

References

Bambusoideae
Plant subtribes